Juan Francisco Ferreri Samuel (born 30 July 1970 in Florida) commonly known as Juan Ferreri, is a  former Uruguayan footballer who used to play as a midfielder and now is assistant coach of Jorge Giordano in Racing.

Club career
Ferreri started his career at Defensor Sporting in 1991.

He was signed by Dundee United in January 1995.

International career
Ferreri made two appearances for the senior Uruguay national football team.

Honours
Defensor
Uruguayan Primera División: 1990-91
Deportes Iquique
Primera B (Chile): 1997

References

External links

1970 births
Living people
People from Florida Department
Uruguayan footballers
Uruguayan expatriate footballers
Uruguay international footballers
Sud América players
Defensor Sporting players
Club Atlético River Plate (Montevideo) players
Tianjin Jinmen Tiger F.C. players
Wuhan Guanggu players
Deportes Iquique footballers
C.A. Bella Vista players
Rampla Juniors players
Central Español players
Dundee United F.C. players
Uruguayan Primera División players
Scottish Football League players
Expatriate footballers in Scotland
Expatriate footballers in Chile
Expatriate footballers in China
Uruguayan expatriate sportspeople in Chile
Uruguayan expatriate sportspeople in China
Uruguayan expatriate sportspeople in Scotland
Association football midfielders
Uruguayan sportspeople of Italian descent